Victor Fernand Hochepied (29 October 1883 – 26 March 1966) was a French freestyle swimmer who competed in the 1900 Summer Olympics.

In 1900 he won the silver medal with the French team in the 200 metre team swimming, alongside his brother, Maurice Hochepied. He also participated in the 200 metre freestyle competition and in the 200 metre obstacle event but was eliminated in the first round in both.

References

External links
 
Victor Hochepied's profile at databaseOlympics

1883 births
1966 deaths
Sportspeople from Lille
French male freestyle swimmers
Olympic swimmers of France
Swimmers at the 1900 Summer Olympics
Olympic silver medalists for France
Medalists at the 1900 Summer Olympics
Olympic silver medalists in swimming
19th-century French people
20th-century French people